Zorn is a family name of German origin meaning "wrath". Historically, it was predominantly strong in German influenced cities such as Strasbourg, Kempten, Innsbruck, and Würzburg. Today, the surname Zorn can be frequently found in Bavaria, Baden-Württemberg, Rheinland-Pfalz, and Thüringen.

People

Anders Zorn (1860–1920), Swedish painter
Charles Rudolph Zorn (1844–1916), American politician and farmer
Dale Zorn (born 1953), American politician
Eric Zorn (born (1958), columnist for the Chicago Tribune, grandson of Max Zorn
Jim Zorn (born 1953), former National Football League quarterback and head coach
Johannes Zorn (1739–1799), German pharmacist, botanist, and botanical illustrator
John Zorn (born 1953), American composer and saxophonist
Max August Zorn (1906–1993), German-born American mathematician
Pete Zorn (1950–2016), American-born British musician
Trischa Zorn (born 1964), American swimmer, the most successful Paralympian of all time
Werner Zorn (born 1942), German computer scientist

 (1828–1890), Alsatian politician
Franz Zorn von Bulach (1858–1925), auxiliary bishop of Strasbourg
 (1851–1921), Alsatian politician and member of the Reichstag
 (1665–1721), German Baroque architect

Other
Zorn (river), a river in northeastern France
Son of Zorn, an animated/live action hybrid sitcom on Fox
 Zorn 88, a former Norwegian neo-Nazi group

See also

Xorn
Xorn (Dungeons & Dragons)
Chronic Xorn

External links 
 zornfamilyhistory.com

German words and phrases
German-language surnames
Surnames from nicknames